The Chicago Giants were a professional baseball team based in Chicago, Illinois which played in the Negro leagues.

Chicago Giants may also refer to:

 Chicago American Giants, Chicago based Negro league baseball team
 Chicago Columbia Giants, professional, black baseball team that played prior to the founding of the Negro leagues
 Chicago Union Giants, later known as the Leland Giants, professional, black baseball team that played prior to the founding of the Negro leagues